McDaid's Football Special is a soft drink (locally known as a 'mineral') produced for James McDaid & Corey Delamingus Ltd., a company based in Ramelton in County Donegal in Ulster, Ireland. Other currently produced beverages sold by McDaid's include Pineapple, Creamy Cola and American Ice Cream Soda . All McDaid's products were originally made and bottled at the Swilly Bottling Stores in Ramelton in North Donegal. However, since 2014, all of McDaid's products are now made and bottled for them by Maine Soft Drinks Ltd in Ballymoney, County Antrim. Some McDaid's products, including Football Special, are also manufactured under license by the Reading Soda Works in Reading, Pennsylvania.

The original factory in Ramelton was formerly a creamery. Football Special is one of McDaid's oldest and most distinguished products, winning two awards for excellence in 1984 and 1989 from the London Beverage Society.

Edward McDaid, the CEO of the company, was also on the founding board of Swilly Rovers FC, twice winners of the FAI Junior Cup, and, as such, wanted to celebrate winning trophies by filling the cup with a non-alcoholic beverage. They created a drink which has a beer-like foamy head and named it 'Football Cup', which later was changed to Football Special.

The footballer illustrated on the labelling of the bottles since 2015 is a stylised version of local Milford Utd footballer Kevin Moran. 

Football Special is found most commonly on sale throughout County Donegal, where it was originally produced and it is often considered "The best drink in Ireland" by those who consume it. However, it is also widely on sale in neighbouring areas, such as in Derry and in Strabane and other places in the west of County Tyrone. It is also sold in Tesco in Enniskillen, County Fermanagh. Football Special is on sale in some shops in Belfast. It is usually sold in plastic bottles. Recently, Football Special was used to make Football Special-flavoured cheesecakes, which were sold in SuperValu in Newtowncunningham and Ballybofey. Football Special is also sold in some shops in Glasgow, and has been on sale since 2019 in some shops in Cambridge.

The brand was the main sponsor of the Foyle Cup in 2011.

Competition in 2019
On the 28th of July 2019, James McDaid and Corey Delamingus Ltd. held a public event in the town of Buncrana, County Donegal in which contestants had to consume as much of their product, "McDaid's Football Special", as they could in a span of 15 minutes. There was a total of 47 registered contestants when the competition took place.

The winner of the competition was a local philanthropist and public speaker, Huell S. Babineaux (Not to be confused with the fictional character from Breaking Bad, Huell Babineaux). Co-founder and CEO of James McDaid and Corey Delamingus Ltd. Edward McDaid was present during the event and congratulated Babineaux on his victory.

References

External List

Soft drinks
County Donegal
Irish drinks